Abu Yaqub Yusuf Ibn Yahya ibn al-Zayyat al-Tadili (born in Beni Mellal, died 1229/30) was a sufi mystic, influential jurist and hagiographer  from Morocco. He is the biographer of many sufi saints. His best known publication is the at-Tashawwuf ila rijal at-tasawwuf (Looking upon the men of Sufism), ed. Ahmed Tawfiq (Rabat: Faculte des Lettres et des Sciences Humaines 1984). It was written ca. 1220. At-Tadili also wrote the hagiography of Abu al-Abbas as-Sabti entitled Akhbar Abi'l-Abbas as-Sabti. Like his Al-tashawwuf (e.g. on Abu Madyan) it contains many autobiographical passages of Abu al-Abbas himself.

References

On the ideas of At-Tadili:The Essential Titus Burckhardt, ed. William Stoddart, p. 274-5
Yusuf Ibn Al Zayyat Al Tadili, Regards sur le temps des soufis: Vie des saints du sud marocain des Ve, VIe, VIIe siecles de l'hegire. traduit de l'Arabe par Maurice De Fenoyl, ed. A. Toufiq  (French transl. of  Al Tadili's Al Tashawwuf), EDDIF/ UNESCO, Casablanca 1994-1995
Daphna Ephrat, "In Quest of an Ideal Type of Saint: Some Observations on the First Generation of Moroccan Awliyā' Allāh in "Kitāb al-tashawwuf"", Studia Islamica, No. 94 (2002), pp. 67–84

External links
Article by the Awqaf ministry of Morocco (in Arabic)

Moroccan biographers
Moroccan Sufi writers
1229 deaths
People from Beni Mellal
13th-century Moroccan people
12th-century Moroccan people
People from Kasba Tadla
Year of birth unknown